Lilian Lewis, née Burwell, (1904 - unknown) was an American zoologist known for her success as an African-American and for her research in gonadogenesis.

Early life and education 
Born Lilian Burwell in Meridian, Mississippi on August 13, 1904, she attended Howard University, where she studied with Ernest Everett Just and graduated with a bachelor's degree in 1925. Lewis studied at the University of Chicago for her master's degree and doctorate, which she earned in 1931 and 1946, respectively. While studying at the University of Chicago, she was a member of the honor societies Sigma Xi and Sigma Delta Epsilon. Though her Ph.D. studies were delayed for several reasons - including the adversities faced by Roger Arliner Young at the same institution, her marriage in 1934, and the birth of her child - she completed a doctoral degree in endocrinology.

Career and research 
Lewis held several teaching appointments throughout her career. She began with short stints as an assistant/associate professor at the State Agriculture and Mechanics College of South Carolina (1925-1929) and Morgan College (1929-1931); both before she began graduate studies. From 1931-1947, Lewis taught at Tillotson College to finance her doctoral studies, despite earning two Rosenwald Fellowships from the University of Chicago. After earning her doctorate, Lewis spent the remainder of her career at Winston-Salem Teacher's College. Her research explored gonadogenesis in ducks, cellular differentiation, embryology, and sex hormones.

References 

American zoologists
American endocrinologists
Women endocrinologists
Women zoologists
American women biologists
1904 births
People from Meridian, Mississippi
Year of death unknown